Brieulles may refer to two communes in France:
 Brieulles-sur-Bar, in the Ardennes department
 Brieulles-sur-Meuse, in the Meuse department